Valiyankode Umer Qazi ( Arabic:عمر القاضي بلنكوتي, Malayalam: വെളിയങ്കോട്ട് ഉമര്‍ ഖാസി(റ) ) was a Muslim scholar, freedom fighter and poet. He was active in the Civil disobedience movement and refused to pay tax to the government in British India.

Early life
Khasi was born to Ali Musliyar, a decedent of Sheikh Hasan Tabee, and Amina, in the house known as "Kaziyarakath" in Hijra 1177 Rabee Awal 10. His parents died before he was ten years old. He obtained the basic studies from his father in his early childhood.

When he was eleven, he was enrolled in Tanoor Darse, under the mentorship Ahmed Musliyar, a decedent of Makdoom family. He then studied with Aboobacker Hisham, also known as Aoukoya Musliyar. He was admitted in Ponnani Darse in his 13th year and accepted the guidance of Mammikutty Kazi. He learned Fathul Mueen and other authentic classical texts from there. After the six-year course at Ponnani, he left there after the death of his teacher Mammikutty Musliyar.

The meeting with Mamburam Thangal
He travelled to Mamburam Thangal with his friend Aoukoya. It is believed he lost all of his knowledge by confusing in the authenticity of the Thangal as Sheikh Murabbe.    He accepted Mamburam Thangal as his guide, and this meeting was recorded by Mamburam Mala.

His social service
He was installed as the supreme judge in the Muslim locality, under Valiyangode Juma Masjid. He depended upon Thuhfa of Ibn Hajar to announce the verdicts. He was appointed as Mudarris, the chief dean in the mosque-based college. He was accompanied by his companion Aoukoya Musliyar, who served as his assistant and coworker. Debates occurred between them on the swalath between Tarvih namaz.

As Freedom fighter
He was an early participant in the Civil disobedience movement in Indian peninsula, refusing to pay tax ordered by Amsham Adikari, the local chieftain appointed by the British government. Marakkar Sahib stepped in and promised to pay his tax until his death. When Marakkar Sahib died, the issue once again became problematic.

As a poet
He wrote poetry. During his stay in jail, he conveyed his thought to Mamburam via poems. He used to sandwich his letters with poems.

Affection for Muhammed
He expressed his passion for the Islamic Prophet Muhammed in poems and prose. The lines which start with عمر الفقير  are carved in the threshold of Muhammad's shrine in Medina.

Death
Realising he would soon die, he prepared his own grave and awaited death.

References

1760s births
1856 deaths
Poets from Kerala
Muslim mystics
Muslim poets
Indian male poets
Indian Muslims
People from Malappuram district
Mappilas
Indian independence activists from Kerala